Salzgitter – Wolfenbüttel is an electoral constituency (German: Wahlkreis) represented in the Bundestag. It elects one member via first-past-the-post voting. Under the current constituency numbering system, it is designated as constituency 49. It is located in southeastern Lower Saxony, comprising the city of Salzgitter, the district of Wolfenbüttel, and northern parts of the district of Goslar.

Salzgitter – Wolfenbüttel was created for the inaugural 1949 federal election. Since 2021, it has been represented by Dunja Kreiser of the Social Democratic Party (SPD).

Geography
Salzgitter – Wolfenbüttel is located in southeastern Lower Saxony. As of the 2021 federal election, it comprises the independent city of Salzgitter, the entirety of the district of Wolfenbüttel, and the Samtgemeinde of Lutter am Barenberge and municipalities of Langelsheim, Liebenburg, and Seesen from the district of Goslar.

History
Salzgitter – Wolfenbüttel was created in 1949, then known as Gandersheim – Salzgitter. In the 1965 through 1976 elections, it was named Salzgitter. It acquired its current name in the 1980 election. In the inaugural Bundestag election, it was Lower Saxony constituency 27 in the numbering system. From 1953 through 1961, it was number 49. From 1965 through 1998, it was number 44. In the 2002 and 2005 elections, it was number 49. In the 2009 election, it was number 50. Since the 2013 election, it has been number 49.

Originally, the constituency comprised the independent city of Salzgitter, the district of Gandersheim, and the Samtgemeinde of Baddeckenstedt from the Wolfenbüttel district. In the 1980 through 1998 elections, it comprised the independent city of Salzgitter and district of Wolfenbüttel. It acquired its current borders in the 2002 election.

Members
The constituency has been held by the Social Democratic Party (SPD) during all but two Bundestag terms since 1949. Its first representative was Karl Bielig of the SPD, who served from 1949 to 1953. Wilhelm Höck of the Christian Democratic Union (CDU) won the constituency in 1953 and was re-elected in 1957. In 1961, Hans-Jürgen Junghans of the SPD was elected. He was succeeded in 1987 by Wilhelm Schmidt, who served until 2005. Sigmar Gabriel has served as representative since 2005; Gabriel served as Vice-Chancellor of Germany from 2013 to 2018. He was succeeded as representative by Dunja Kreiser in 2021.

Election results

2021 election

2017 election

2013 election

2009 election

References

Federal electoral districts in Lower Saxony
Hanover
1949 establishments in West Germany
Constituencies established in 1949